Russo is a common Southern Italian and 
Sicilian surname. It is the Southern counterpart of Rossi and comes from a nickname indicating red hair or beard, from russo, russë and russu, from Late Latin russus or rubius, Classical Latin rubeus, "red".

Geographical distribution 
As of 2014, 61.5% of all known bearers of the surname Russo were residents of Italy (frequency 1:277), 18.6% of the United States (1:5,429), 5.1% of Argentina (1:2,347), 4.6% of Brazil (1:12,345), 1.1% of France (1:17,406) and 1.0% of Australia (1:6,667).

In Italy, the frequency of the surname was higher than national average (1:277) in the following regions:
 1. Campania (1:72)
 2. Sicily (1:123)
 3. Calabria (1:155)
 4. Apulia (1:205)
 5. Basilicata (1:213)

In Argentina, the frequency of the surname was higher than national average (1:2,347) in the following provinces:
 1. Buenos Aires (1:1,034)
 2. Buenos Aires Province (1:1,657)

In the United States, the frequency of the surname was higher than national average (1:5,429) in the following states:
 1. Connecticut (1:1,360)
 2. Rhode Island (1:1,384)
 3. New Jersey (1:1,433)
 4. New York (1:1,560)
 5. Massachusetts (1:1,920)
 6. Florida (1:3,605)
 7. Pennsylvania (1:3,637)
 8. New Hampshire (1:3,888)
 9. Louisiana (1:3,949)
 10. Delaware (1:3,981)
 11. Nevada (1:4,507)
 12. Maine (1:4,594)

In Brazil, the frequency of the surname was higher than national average (1:12,345) only in one state:
 1. São Paulo (1:4,431)

Notable people named Russo 
 Aaron Russo, libertarian entertainment businessman
 Adam Russo (born 1983), Canadian/Italian professional ice hockey goaltender
 Adriana Russo (born 1954), Italian actress and television personality
 Adriano Russo (born 1987), Italian footballer who plays as a defender
 Albert Russo (born 1943), Belgian bilingual (English and French) writer
 Alecu Russo (1819-1859), Moldavian Romanian writer, literary critic and publicist
 Alejandro Russo (born 1968), Argentine former professional footballer
 Alessia Russo (born 1999), English footballer 
 Alexander Russo (writer), education writer
 Alexander Russo (athlete), Brazilian track and field sprinter
 Ana Bedran-Russo (née Ana Karina Bedran de Castro), an associate professor in restorative dentist
 Andrew Russo (born 1975), American pianist
 Andy Russo (born 1948), American college basketball coach 
 Angelo Russo (born 1961), Italian actor
 Anna Russo, Italian writer
 Anthony Russo, including:
Anthony Russo (American football), American football wide receiver
Anthony Russo (director) (born 1970), Emmy Award-winning film and television director
Anthony Russo (mobster) (1916–1979), Genovese crime family figure
Anthony Russo (mayor), the 35th mayor of Hoboken, New Jersey
Anthony Russo (whistleblower) (1936–2008), involved in the Pentagon Papers leak
 Antonino Russo Giusti (1876-1957), Italian dramatist
 Avraam Russo (né Abraham Ipjian in 1969), Syrian-born Russian pop singer of Armenian origin
 Bartolomeo Russo (1866–1941), New Zealand fisherman, horticulturist and farmer
 Basil Russo (born 1946), American attorney, politician of the Democratic Party, and judge
 Bill Russo (born 1947), American former football coach
 Cailin Russo (born 1993), American model and musician
 Carmen Russo (born 1959) Italian dancer, actress, television personality and singer
 Catherine Allison Russo (born 1976), American healthcare consultant and politician
 Carine Russo (née Collet; born 1962), Belgian politician, member of Ecolo, and author
 Charles-Édouard Russo (born 1980), French professional golfer
 Christopher "Mad Dog" Russo, American sports radio host
 Cristian Cuffaro Russo (born 1988), Argentine footballer 
 Cindy Russo (born 1952), American women's basketball head coach 
 Claudia Russo (born 1983), Italian candidate for Miss World 2008
 Clement Russo (born 1995), French road and cyclo-cross cyclist
 Clemente Russo (born 1982), Italian Boxer
 Daniel Russo (born 1948), French film actor, comedian and director
 Danilo Russo (born 1987), Italian footballer 
 Danny Russo (1885-1944), American violinist and big band leader 
 Darko Russo (born 1962), Serbian professional basketball coach
 David C. Russo (born 1953), American Republican Party politician
 Deanna Russo (born 1979), American actress
 Eddie Russo (1925-2012), American racecar driver
 Elena Russo (born 1972), Italian actress of cinema, television and theatre
 Erminia Russo (born 1964), Canadian volleyball player
 Evandro Russo Ramos (born 1985), Brazilian footballer
 Federico Russo (born 1997), Italian actor
 Felice Angelo "Felix" Russo (1926–2005), Australian rules footballer 
 Ferdinando Russo (1866–1927), Italian journalist and dialect poet from Naples
 Francesco Russo (born 1981), Italian footballer
 Francois Russo (born 1966), the creative director and founder of Maison Takuya
 Frederick Dello Russo, American politician and funeral director
 George Russo (born 1980), English actor 
 Giacomo Russo (1937-1967), Italian racing driver
 Giada Russo (born 1997), Italian figure skater
 Gianni Russo (born 1943), American actor and singer
 Giovanni Russo (or Dovani Roso; born 1972), Croatian-born Israeli former footballer
 Giuni Russo (1951–2004), Italian singer-songwriter 
 Giuseppe Genco Russo (1893-1976), Italian mafioso
 Giuseppe Russo (born 1983), Italian footballer who plays as a midfielder
 Gus Russo, American author and researcher of the assassination of John F. Kennedy
 James Russo (born 1953),  American film and television actor
 Jamie Russo (born 1981), Australian former professional rugby league footballer 
 Jason Russo
 Jeff Russo (born  1969), American composer and music producer
 Jonathan Judge-Russo (born 1983), American actor and producer
 Joe Russo, including:
 Joe Russo (director) (born 1971), an Emmy Award-winning film and television director
 Joe Russo (driver) (1901–1934), an American racecar driver active in the 1930s
 Joe Russo (musician) (b. 1976), a jazz/rock and roll drummer
 John Russo, including:
 John F. Russo (c. 1934), politician from New Jersey
 John A. Russo (born 1939),  American screenwriter and film director
 John Russo (baseball) (born 1973), baseball coach
 José Luis Russo (born 1958), Uruguayan  former footballer
 Julee Russo (also known as Julee Rosso), American cook and food writer
 Justin Russo (born 1976), American musician
 Kevin Russo (born  1984), American former professional baseball player
 Kristin Russo (born 1980), American speaker, personality, and LGBTQ activist
 Laura Garcia Moreno Russo (1915-2001), Brazilian librarian 
 Luciano Russo, Italian prelate of the Catholic Church who works in the diplomatic service of the Holy See
 Lucio F. Russo, American politician
 Lucio Russo, Italian historian of science
 Lucio F. Russo (1912–2004), American lawyer and politician
 Luigi Fontana Russo (1868-1953),Italian economist and lecturer
 Marcella Russo, Australian actress 
 Marcelo Fabián Méndez Russo (born 1981), Uruguayan former footballer
 Marcelo Russo Guerreiro Correia (born 1993), Portuguese footballer
 Margaret Russo (1931–2006), All-American Girls Professional Baseball League player
 Mariné Russo (born 1980), Argentine former field hockey player 
 Marcella Russo, Australian actress
 Marco Russo (born 1982), Italian footballer
 Marisabina Russo (née Stark), a children's book author and illustrator
 Marius Russo (1915-2005), American starting pitcher in Major League Baseball
 Martin A. Russo (born 1944), a U.S. Democratic politician and lobbyist
 Martin P. Russo (born 1968), American trial lawyer
 Matías Russo (born 1985), Argentine racing driver
 Meredith Russo (born ca 1986/1987), American young adult and middle grade fiction author
 Melissa Russo (born 1968), American television journalist 
 Michael Dello-Russo (born 1956), Argentine former football player and manager
 Michael Russo (disambiguation), several people
 Michele Russo (born 1986), Italian footballer in the role of defender
 Michele Russo (bishop) (1945–2019), Italian Roman Catholic bishop of Doba, Chad
 Miguel Ángel Russo (born 1956), Argentine former football player and manager
 Monette Russo (born 1988),  Australian former artistic gymnast
 Nadia Russo-Bossie (1901–1988), a pioneering Romanian aviator
 Nat Russo (born 1970), American fantasy fiction author 
 Neal Russo (1920–1996), American sportswriter
 Nello Russo (born 1981), Italian former footballer 
 Nicola Russo (born 1990), Italian football midfielder
 Nicholas Russo (1845–1902), Italian-American priest, professor, Boston College president, and church founder
 Orazio Russo (born 1973), Italian former professional football (soccer) player
 Pasquale Russo (born 1947), Italian Camorrista and boss
 Pat Russo (born 1941), American model 
 Patricia Russo (born 1952), American businessperson
 Patti Russo (born 1966), American singer, songwriter and actress
 Paul Russo (1914-1976), American racecar driver
 Paul A. Russo (born 1943), American diplomat
 Peter Russo (born 1959), Australian former rules footballer
 Peter Russo (politician) (born 1955), Australian politician
 Pietro Russo (fl. 1507), Sicilian mapmaker
 Philippe Russo (born 1961), French singer-songwriter 
 Pietro Paolo Russo (1611–1657), Roman Catholic bishop of Nusco 
 Raffaele Russo (born 1999), Italian football player
 Rebecca Russo (born 1992), American-born women's ice hockey player
 Renato Russo (1960-1996), Brazilian singer and songwriter
 Rene Russo (born 1954), American actress, producer and model
 Riccardo Russo (born 1992), Italian motorcycle racer
 Richard Russo (born 1954), American novelist
 Richard Paul Russo, American science fiction writer
 Robbie Russo (born 1993), American ice hockey defenceman
 Roberto Russo (musician) (born 1966), Italian pianist and composer
 Rosa Russo Iervolino, Italian politician and former Mayor of Naples
 Russ Russo (born 1975), American film actor
 Ry Russo-Young (born 1981), American filmmaker
 Salvatore Russo (born 1958), Italian Camorrista and boss of the Russo clan
 Salvatore Russo (footballer) (born 1971), Italian former footballer
 Sarina Russo (born 1951), Italian entrepreneur
 Sean Russo (born 1991), Australian swimmer
 Santo J. "Sonny" Russo (1929–2013), American jazz trombonist
 Stefano Russo (footballer, born 1989), Italian footballer
 Stefano Russo (footballer, born 2000), German-Italian footballer
 Tal Russo, Israeli general
 Thomas "Thom" Russo, American record producer, engineer, mixer and songwriter
 Tommaso Russo (born 1971), Italian boxer
 Vanessa Rousso (also known as Vanessa Ashley Rousso; born  1983), American professional poker player
 Vince Russo, American author, podcaster, professional wrestling writer and pundit
 Vincenza Carrieri-Russo (born 1984), American model, actress, entrepreneur and beauty pageant titleholder 
 Vito Russo (1946-1990), American LGBT activist, film historian and author
 Vittorio Russo (born 1939), Italian football manager and former player
 William Russo (musician) (1928-2003), American composer, arranger, and musician

Fictional characters 
 Blossom Russo, main character on the TV series Blossom
 Alex Russo, main character in Wizards of Waverly Place, and other family members:
 Jerry Russo, her father
 Theresa Russo, her mother
 Justin Russo, her older brother
 Max Russo, her younger brother
 Dominic Russo, main character on the TV series Chasing Life
 Billy Russo, Marvel comic villain
Ladd Russo, one of the main [[List of Baccano! characters#Russo family|characters in the anime series Baccano!]]
 Peter Russo, a character on the TV series House of Cards

See also 
Russo, Switzerland – place name
Russo (disambiguation)
Rossi (surname)
Rosso (surname)

References 

Italian-language surnames
Surnames from nicknames